A polite fiction is a social scenario in which all participants are aware of a truth, but pretend to believe in some alternative version of events to avoid conflict or embarrassment. Polite fictions are closely related to euphemism, in which a word or phrase that might be impolite, disagreeable, or offensive is replaced by another word or phrase that both speaker and listener understand to have the same meaning. In scholarly usage, "polite fiction" can be traced to at least 1953.

An informal example would be of someone who goes out drinking after telling their family that they are merely going for an evening walk to enjoy the night air. Even though many relatives involved know that the person is likely leaving to drink alcohol, and may come home drunk, they may act as if he/she is going out for a walk, and act as if they don't notice signs of alcohol intoxication when they return. Another common example is a couple that has had an argument, after which one of them absents themself from a subsequent social gathering, with the other claiming that they are ill, especially if this is a regular occurrence. In these instances, although people in the couple's social circle may have experienced this behavior numerous times and are aware that a problem of some sort exists in the relationship, they may remain silent for fear of upsetting the couple, thereby further troubling their relationship. This violates social norms (a human behavior related to ethics codes and ethics clarity), and can be used to retain politeness and trust, with the effect of maintenance of social bonds and provision of ideological support.

Polite fictions can slip into denial. This is especially the case when the fiction is actually meant to fool some observers, such as outsiders or children judged too young to be told the truth. The truth then becomes "the elephant in the room"; no matter how obvious it is, the people most affected pretend to others and to themselves that it is not so. This can be used to humorous effect in comedy, where a character will seem bent on making it impossible to maintain the polite fiction.

See also
 Diplomatic illness
 Interpersonal communication
 Kayfabe
 Legal fiction
 Minimisation (psychology)
 Obfuscation
 Persuasive definition
 Polite lie
 White lie
 What happens on tour, stays on tour

References

External links
 Explanations of "polite fictions" in U.S. culture for Japanese visitors

Figures of speech
Etiquette